Cornwall County Constabulary was the Home Office police force for the county of Cornwall, England, until 1967.

The force was formed in 1857. It absorbed Bodmin Borough Police in 1866, Liskeard Borough Police in 1877, Launceston Borough Police in 1883, Falmouth Borough Police, Helston Borough Police, Penryn Borough Police and St Ives Borough Police in 1889, Truro City Police in 1921, and Penzance Borough Police and the Isles of Scilly Police in 1947. From 1947 it was officially called the Cornwall and Isles of Scilly Constabulary, although this name was rarely used. In 1965, it had an establishment of 500 and an actual strength of 446.

On 1 April 1967 it amalgamated with Devon and Exeter Police and Plymouth City Police to form Devon and Cornwall Constabulary.

Chief Constables
 1857–1896 : Colonel Walter Raleigh Gilbert 
 1896–1909 : Richard Middleton Hill 
 1909–1935 : Lieutenant-Colonel Hugh Bateman Protheroe-Smith, OBE   
 1935–1956 : Major Edgar Hare   
 c.1965 : Kenneth Mortimer Wherly

Footnotes

References

Devon and Cornwall Constabulary family tree
History of Wadebridge Town and Police, by Peter Tuthill

Defunct police forces of England
History of Cornwall
Organisations based in Cornwall
Government agencies established in 1857
1967 disestablishments in England
1857 establishments in England
Crime in Cornwall